William E. Faison House is a historic home located near Giddensville in Sampson County, North Carolina.  It was built about 1870, and is a two-story, double-pile, frame dwelling, with Greek Revival and Italianate style design elements.  It has a hipped roof; one-story, gable roofed rear ell; and features a one-story front porch.   Also on the property is the contributing family cemetery (c. 1904).

It was added to the National Register of Historic Places in 2005.

References

Houses on the National Register of Historic Places in North Carolina
Greek Revival houses in North Carolina
Italianate architecture in North Carolina
Houses completed in 1870
Houses in Sampson County, North Carolina
National Register of Historic Places in Sampson County, North Carolina